The Lafayette County Courthouse occupies a city block in the heart of Lewisville, Arkansas, the seat of Lafayette County.  It is a two-story brick building with Art Deco styling, built in 1940-42 as a Works Progress Administration project.  Although it has a basically rectangular plan, it has a stepped visual appearance, with single- and two-story projections.  Ornamentation of the buff brick surfaces is minimal.  It is the county's finest Art Deco structure.

The building was listed on the National Register of Historic Places in 1993.

See also
National Register of Historic Places listings in Lafayette County, Arkansas

References

Courthouses on the National Register of Historic Places in Arkansas
Art Deco architecture in Arkansas
Buildings and structures completed in 1942
Buildings and structures in Lafayette County, Arkansas
1942 establishments in Arkansas
National Register of Historic Places in Lafayette County, Arkansas
Courthouses in Arkansas